Rachel Taylor (born 13 June 1983) is a Welsh rugby union player who plays in either Lock or back row for the Bristol Ladies/Newport Gwent Dragons and the Wales women's national rugby union team. She won her first international cap against Canada in 2007, and has since captained the team.

Early life
Rachel Taylor was born in Bangor on 13 June 1983. She began playing rugby at the age of five, later describing her family as "rugby-orientated" since her father was a rugby coach and her older brother already played for a local team. Although she tried a variety of sports in her youth, she returned to rugby. Once her brother switched to playing association football, she focused on rugby, seeking to play for her national team. She is trained as a Paraveterinary worker, and gave the keynote speech at the British Veterinary Association in 2017.

Playing career
She has been given the nickname "Tails" by her teammates. She made her debut for the Wales women's national rugby union team against Canada in 2007. She was first named as captain of the team in 2012 for the Women's Six Nations Championship.

Taylor won her 50th cap for Wales when she played against Ireland in the 2015 Women's Six Nations Championship. She has continued to captain her national team, including at the 2016 Women's Six Nations Championship. She is also involved in encouraging women's rugby at a grassroots level, being the Wales Rugby Union coordinator for the RGC West area in North Wales. This is in preparation for a transition from her playing career into retirement.

References

1983 births
Living people
Female rugby union players
Rugby union players from Bangor, Gwynedd
Wales international rugby union players
Welsh female rugby union players
Women veterinarians
Wales international women's rugby sevens players